Kevin Givens (born March 1, 1997) is an American football defensive tackle for the San Francisco 49ers of the National Football League (NFL). He played college football at Penn State.

Early life and high school
Givens was born in Newark, New Jersey and grew up in Altoona, Pennsylvania and attended Altoona Area High School, where he played defensive end and fullback on the football team. As a senior he was named first-team All-State on defense and rushed for 317 yards and six touchdowns on offense.

College career
Givens was a member of the Penn State Nittany Lions for five seasons, redshirting his true freshman season. He was named the Big Ten Conference All-Freshman team after making 26 tackles, seven tackles for loss and 4.5 sacks in his first season. As a redshirt sophomore, Givens recorded 23 tackles with four tackles for loss, 3.5 sacks, a forced fumble and a fumble recovery. Givens finished his redshirt junior season with 33 tackles, 10.5 tackles for loss and five sacks. After the season Givens, who had already completed his undergraduate degree, announced that he would forgo his final season in order to enter the 2019 NFL Draft.

Professional career

Givens signed with the San Francisco 49ers as an undrafted free agent on April 28, 2019. He was waived at the end of training camp during final roster cuts, but was re-signed to the team's practice squad on September 1, 2019. The 49ers promoted Givens to the active roster on December 28. Givens reached Super Bowl LIV with the 49ers, who were defeated by the Kansas City Chiefs by a score of 31–20.

In Week 7 against the New England Patriots in 2020, Givens recorded his first career sack on Jarrett Stidham late in the fourth quarter during the 33–6 win. Givens was placed on a roster exemption on December 12, 2020, and was reinstated to the active roster five days later.

On September 25, 2021, Givens was placed on injured reserve. He was activated on October 30.

On March 10, 2022, Givens re-signed with the 49ers.

References

External links
San Francisco 49ers bio
Penn State Nittany Lions bio

1997 births
Living people
American football defensive tackles
Penn State Nittany Lions football players
Players of American football from Pennsylvania
San Francisco 49ers players
Sportspeople from Altoona, Pennsylvania